Bulgarica nitidosa is a species of air-breathing land snail, a terrestrial pulmonate gastropod mollusk in the family Clausiliidae, the door snails.

Distribution 
This species is endemic to Bohemia, in the Czech Republic.

References

Clausiliidae
Endemic fauna of the Czech Republic
Gastropods described in 1893